Macdunnoughia tetragona is a species of moth of the family Noctuidae. It is found in Asia, including India and Taiwan.

References

External links
 
 

Plusiini
Moths described in 1858
Moths of Asia
Taxa named by Francis Walker (entomologist)